Ahmet Dereli (born 22 October 1992) is a Turkish footballer who plays for Altınordu.

Ahmet was born in Germany to parents of Turkish descent. He made his debut for the Turkey national under-21 football team in a friendly 2-0 loss to Austria U21.

References

External links
 TFF Profile

1992 births
Living people
Footballers from Berlin
Turkish footballers
Turkey under-21 international footballers
German footballers
German people of Turkish descent
Adanaspor footballers
Süper Lig players
Berliner AK 07 players
Hatayspor footballers
Association football wingers